Separatist was a technical death metal band that formed in 2003 in Australia and is now a one-man project.

History
Separatist began in 2003 in Hobart, Tasmania, Australia as a full band consisting of Sam "Disho" Dishington on vocals, James Brady and Dave Gilbert on guitars, Luke Ranson on bass and Matt Carter on drums. The band released a full-length album in 2008, titled The Motionless Apocalypse. In April 2011, the band split up. The band disbanded after Disho removed Dave Gilbert and James Brady from the lineup, and subsequently lost what would have been their second album to a computer malfunction. Disho left the band and the band broke up shortly afterwards.

In 2014, Disho took up the mantle of Separatist but as a solo project, with him recording all vocals, bass, and guitar and programming all the drums. After Disho took control of the project, he released a double album, under the titles Closure and Motionless. The albums' profits were donated to the A21 Campaign, a campaign to support the war against human trafficking. The songs were all original compositions from their original second album. Disho is currently working on a band called Departe, with a former member of the band, which is now signed to Season of Mist.

Musical style
Several sites have described the band as being able to create fans for itself instantly. According to the Metal Injection, the band is a wonder in musical talent. Here is their full quote: 

No Clean Singing also expressed a love for the band, stating:

Members
Current
Sam "Disho" Dishington - Vocals (2003-2011, 2014-present), guitar, bass, programming (2014-present)

Former
James Brady - Guitars (2003-2011)
Dave Gilbert - Guitars (2003-2011)
Mitch Golding - Guitars (2007-2011)
Luke Ranson - Bass (2003-2011)
Matt Carter - Drums (2003-2011)

Discography
Studio albums
The Motionless Apocalypse (2008; Reverb Productions)
Closure (2014; Independent)
Motionless (2014; Independent)

Compilation appearances
Christian Deathcore Volume 3 (2014; Christian Deathcore)
Mother of Deathcore Vol. 3 (2014; Mother of Deathcore)
Christian Deathcore Volume 4 (2015; Christian Deathcore)

References

External links
Official Website
Bandcamp

Australian Christian metal musical groups
Musical groups established in 2003
Musical groups disestablished in 2011
Musical groups reestablished in 2014